This is a list of films which have placed number one at the weekend box office in Ecuador during 2010.

References
 

2010 in Ecuador
Ecuador
2010